Tutaki (also Romanized as Tūtakī) is a village in Tutaki Rural District, in the Central District of Siahkal County, Gilan Province, Iran. At the 2006 census, its population was 110, in 30 families.

References 

Populated places in Siahkal County